Regina Mundi may be:

Queen of the World
 Regina Mundi Catholic Church (Soweto)
 Mary, Queen of the World Cathedral
 Santuario di Maria Santissima Regina del Mondo
 Regina Mundi Catholic College
 Regina Mundi Cathedral, Bujumbura
 Regina Mundi High School
 Beata Mundi Regina
 Regina High School (Michigan)
 The Regina Mundi Pontifical Institute

See also
 Queen of Heaven